Margaret Evangeline McDonald (Commander of The Royal Victorian Order) was the first female Ambassador to the United States from the Bahamas, from 1985 until 1992.  She was the first woman appointed Secretary to the Cabinet, in 1982.

McDonald graduated from the University of Pittsburgh Graduate School of Public and International Affairs.

References

Bahamian women ambassadors
University of Pittsburgh alumni
Place of birth missing
Date of birth missing
Commanders of the Royal Victorian Order
Ambassadors of the Bahamas to the United States